The American Party of South Carolina is a third party in the United States. Established in 2014, the party is active only in South Carolina.

History
The American Party of South Carolina was founded by physician Oscar Lovelace and former South Carolina Superintendent of Education Jim Rex in 2014. According to Rex and Lovelace, their impetus in starting the new party was to present a centrist alternative to the Republican Party and Democratic Party that could address perceived government dysfunction. Rex and Lovelace began collecting the 10,000 petition signatures required for formal party recognition under South Carolina state law during the 2013 South Carolina State Fair. Voter discontent with the United States federal government shutdown of 2013, which coincided with the fair, helped invigorate an unusually robust level of interest in the proposed new party.

In 2014, the first year of electoral activity for the party, it unsuccessfully ran four candidates for public office in that year's South Carolina elections. The same year, its youth wing, Young Americans, was established with an inaugural chapter at Winthrop University.

The party's 2016 state convention was attended by 61 delegates from nine South Carolina counties, and nominated Peter Skewes as its candidate for president of the United States, as well as candidates for five other offices. As of 2016, the party said it hoped to expand beyond South Carolina and it registered with the Federal Elections Commission the same year.

On October 14, 2018 a group of independent state political organizations, including the American Party, joined together to create the Alliance Party. Jim Rex is the National Chair.

In the 2018 South Carolina elections the party unsuccessfully ran thirteen candidates, one of whom was under a fusion vote with the Democratic Party, for public office.

In the 2020 South Carolina elections the American Party, now affiliated with the Alliance Party, presidential candidate Roque "Rocky" De La Fuente Guerra received 1,862 votes, around 0.07%. The party unsuccessfully ran five other candidates for public office.

Platform
According to the party, it supports term limits, campaign finance reform, and "attacking problems from the center instead of the left or the right".

See also
Centrism
List of political parties in the United States
Third Party (United States)

References

External links
 

2014 establishments in South Carolina
Political parties established in 2014
Political parties in South Carolina
Centrist political parties in the United States
Regional and state political parties in the United States